The Holden Commodore (VX) is an executive car that was produced by Holden from 2000 to 2002. It was the second iteration of the third generation of the Commodore. Its range included the luxury variants, Holden Berlina (VX) and Holden Calais (VX), and it formed the basis for a new generation Holden Ute (VU)  coupé utility and Holden Monaro (V2) coupé.

The VX series was produced between October 2000 and September 2002, as a minor restyling update to the VT series from 1997. It introduced greater model differentiation along with gains in crash safety. An intermediate Series II was launched in August 2001, featuring a revised suspension system among other changes.

History of development

Design 
Visually, the exterior features a revised headlamp design over the preceding VT among other changes. These include the tail lamp panel now replaced by two separate individual light assemblies. The Berlina and Calais sedans however retain the full-width boot-lid panel incorporating the tail lamps and the registration plate.

Safety 
Safety played a substantial role in the development of the VX model. Bosch version 5.3 anti-lock brakes were made standard on all variants, a first for an Australian manufactured car; and traction control was made available on vehicles equipped with manual transmission. Extensive research was undertaken to reduce the effects from a side-impact collision through modification of the B-pillars. The risk presented by a side-impact collision in a VX fitted without side airbags is reduced by 50 percent when compared to a similarly specified VT model.

Engine and mechanicals 
Fuel economy was also improved over the previous model by three to four percent. The optional Supercharged Ecotec V6 extended its service to the Executive and Acclaim variants, with the  output figure remaining unchanged from the VT. As well as the supercharged six-cylinder, an even more powerful 5.7-litre Chevrolet-sourced Gen III V8 engine was offered.

A modified front suspension setup received lower control arm pivot points. The Series II update featured the addition of a new rear cross member, revised rear control arm assemblies with new style bushing and toe-control links to the semi-trailing arm rear suspension to better maintain the toe settings during suspension movements, resulting in more predictable car handling, noticeably over uneven surfaces, and improved tyre wear.

Models

Commodore Executive 

The entry-level Executive was a popular choice amongst fleet buyers, and offered standard features such as anti-lock brakes, a driver's air bag, trip computer, and central locking. Along with all other variants, steering wheel audio controls, a CD player, and an electrically retracting power antenna were now standard. The naturally aspirated 3.8-litre Ecotec V6 came standard on the Executive, with the option of the Supercharged Ecotec V6 or Gen III V8 engine. V6 engines were coupled to a five-speed manual transmission, and V8s came with a six-speed manual. A four-speed automatic transmission was available as an optional extra, regardless of the engine choice.

Commodore Acclaim 

The second tier Acclaim was marketed as a family-oriented variation of the VX range, with a strong emphasis on safety. Building on the equipment levels of the Executive, the Acclaim also featured four airbags, cruise control, traction control, air conditioning and power windows. A four-speed automatic transmission was the only transmission available, although buyers did have the opportunity to opt for the Supercharged Ecotec V6 engine.

Commodore S 
Offered as a sporty alternative to the Acclaim was the Commodore S. Based on the entry-level Executive, features came in the form of a sports body kit, electric windows, 16-inch alloy wheels, sports suspension, air conditioning, cruise control, and a leather steering wheel. However, leather upholstery, traction control, four airbags, 17-inch alloy wheels and the Supercharged Ecotec V6 were offered as options.

Commodore SS 
The SS continued on with the sporting trend of the Commodore S, but incorporated bumper-integrated foglamps, and more aggressively styled alloy wheels. Instead of the six-cylinder engine standard on the "S pack", a Gen III V8 engine and six-speed manual transmission came as standard. A more advanced suspension setup, traction control and a passenger's airbag were also standard, but side impact airbags and leather upholstery remained optional.

Berlina 
This model and the top-of-the-range Calais attributed a notably restyled exterior, when compared to other trim levels. Both featured a full-width rectangular grille, which merged off together with the angled-off headlamps. The rear-end of the sedan is characterised by a boot panel housing the transparent taillights. Nine-spoke, 15-inch machine finished alloy wheels accentuated the prestige image.

Building on the features the Acclaim featured the Berlina added climate control air conditioning, and adjustable seatbelt anchors. 17-inch alloy wheels, sports suspension (the same type found on the SS), limited slip differential and an eight-cylinder engine were all made available as optional extras.

Calais 
The flagship Calais shares the prestige style exterior with the Berlina, but is distinguishable by its 16-inch alloy wheels and chrome outlined foglamps. Standard features included an eight-speaker audio system, ten stack CD player, dual zone automatic climate control, electric front seats and leather steering wheel, gear shifter and handbrake. The Calais presented the same optional features as the Berlina, but allowed for the inclusion of leather upholstery. With the Berlina, the centre console was finished with either the black or beige plastic panel depending on the interior colour scheme, however the Calais upped the ante with a wood grain-faced console, or a satin-finished façade for Series II variants. The Calais was the only model in the lineup that could be had with all three engines, with the Ecotec V6 standard and the supercharged V6 and V8 as options. Manual transmissions were not available however.

Ute (VU) 

Before the VU, Holden had marketed their Commodore-based utility models under the Holden Utility (VG) and Holden Commodore utility (VP, VR, VS) names, although the term "Holden Ute" was also used in their official marketing literature. The VU Ute's successor was assigned the same model code as the sedan it is based on (VY).

Models
The VU replaced the VS Utility. The VU's arrival was 36 months after the VT Commodore sedan, meaning it arrived in time for the launch of the VX Commodore. The Ute employs the same interior as the Commodore, while also picking up the VX's upgraded equipment lists and restyled exterior design.
 Base : Built up from the Commodore Executive's specification. Available with 3.8-litre  Ecotec V6 – 4-speed automatic, 5-speed manual or 5.7-litre  Generation III V8 – 6-speed manual or 4-speed auto
 S : Based on Commodore S specifications. Available with 3.8-litre  Ecotec V6 – 4-speed auto, 5-speed manual.
 SS : Based on Commodore SS specifications, minus side-impact airbags. Available with a 5.7-litre  Generation III V8 – 6-speed manual or 4-speed automatic.
The range received a minor refresh with the VX Series 2 models 12 months later, with the major upgrade being an additional  to Holden's Generation III V8's.

The VU was superseded by the VY ute in September 2002.

Special editions
 SS Fifty: In October 2001, a special edition 'SS Fifty' model was released to mark the 50th anniversary of the introduction of the first "Holden Ute", the Holden 50-2106 coupe utility. Only 500 SS Fitty's were built and were identical in terms of colour scheme, all 500 units were released with a black exterior and a partial leather interior that contained plenty of "hyper yellow" accents. Other items that made the SS 50 different were the chrome sports bar on the back, unique black-and-yellow engine cover, a leather-wrapped steering wheel, handbrake cover and gear knob as well as a colour-coded instrument cluster to match the leather bolsters on the sports seats.
 Storm: From May 2002, a limited edition 'Storm' or 'Storm S' model was released based on the 3.8-litre  Ecotec V6 – 4-speed automatic, 5-speed manual variant. Only 1000 were manufactured. The VU Storm was the luxury variant of the S, initially advertised as having $2,400 worth of additional features and accessories which included but were not limited to air conditioning, ABS anti-lock braking, FE2 sports suspension (also available on the Holden Monaro). driver/passenger airbags, 16 inch six spoke alloy wheels in satin silver, SS side skirts, front and rear bumperettes, SS fog/driving lights, chrome storm badging on rear and sides, seats trimmed in charcoal and black with bolsters in anthracite leather, colour-coded to a unique Titanium finished instrument panel and console, chrome interior door handles, power antenna, electrically adjustable drivers seat and a leather wrapped steering wheel. It was available in a choice of four colours: Hyper (vibrant chromatic yellow metallic); Delft (cobalt blue metallic, also available on the Holden Monaro); Phantom (black metallic with silver highlights); Red Hot (highly chromatic solid red).

HSV range 

The enhanced performance VX and VX Series II range sold by Holden Special Vehicles (HSV) comprised the variants listed below.

Clubsport 

During the development of the VX Clubsport HSV responded to many customers' complaints regarding how Clubsports were difficult to distinguish from standard Holden Commodores. The improvements due to this included a more flamboyant, unique bodykit and exclusive HSV interior features.

GTS 
 Series 1 VX GTS – 112 produced
 Series 2 VX SV300 (rebadged GTS)

Maloo 

In September 2000, the long-lived VS series Maloo utility was finally retired and replaced, from March 2001, by an all-new VU series that mirrored the existing VX series HSV sedans. Mirroring the sedan range, the HSV VU ute was now also available as Maloo R8, which featured standard 'Performance' brakes and a hard tonneau cover with raised rear wing. Overall, 301 examples were produced of the first series VU Maloo.

HSV's VU Series 2 Maloo was introduced in October 2001 in concert with the VX Series II sedans, with minor cosmetic upgrades that included 'blackout' style headlights and additional Maloo range paint colours of Delft blue and HSV Racing green. This upgrade also introduced new security measures in the form of "HSV DNA", which was a micro 'DataDot' component identification system. Overall, 483 examples of VU Series II were produced, including a "15th Anniversary" limited edition launched in June 2002 (with 25 units for Australia and another 5 for New Zealand).

Senator 
The 2000 model underwent a facelift featuring more angular styling and a distinctive 'eggcrate' grille while, mechanically, the VX Series II added toe-control links to the IRS (in line with the Series II update of the Holden Commodore), as well as Microdot technology to deter theft. Most of the main changes to the VX Senator are mostly exterior changes, with visual styling was again designed by former Tom Walkinshaw Racing (TWR) designer Ian Callum. These changes included a chrome grille accent, crossed hatch lower grille, roof spoiler and a discreet boot mounted spoiler. The VX Senator was partly based on the Holden Calais at the time. Electronic Traction Control comes as a standard option. Some features that come with the $72,881 Senator include 10-stacker CD player, two subwoofers with a premium sound system, four airbags, automatic climate control, cruise control, power mirrors and windows.

For the first time the Senator line up features rear parking sensors which beep when close to an object while reversing. An optional satellite navigation system and sunroof were available. The four speed automatic transmission is retained and for brakes there are two front ventilated discs and standard non-ventilated discs at the rear. The Senator weighs  and uses 18.1/100 km of fuel through the city, the fuel tank capacity is 75 litres. Once again the self-levelling rear suspension featured and part of the entertainment package a 6 stacker CD player and 8-speaker sound system was added. ABS and traction control was added for extra safety. Throughout the cabin there is leather trim and dark wood grain on the dashboard. Some extra options that were also available at extra cost was the premium brakes, Satellite navigation, leather-pewter and an upgraded entertainment sound system.

Senator 300 
This car was released in 2001 with the VX, continuing on into the Y series. Some features that come standard are 10 stacker CD system, 8 way power controls for the front seats, woodgrain instruments, electric windows, automatic climate control, ABS and front and side airbags. This top of the range model cost $98,850. The Senator 300 was presented to the public at the Melbourne international motor show. Only 33 cars were built and 7 of the 33 built were to go on sale in New Zealand. The engine is a Callaway-tuned V8 that produces  of power and is only available with a 6-speed manual gearbox. ABS and a cross-drilled premium brake system were fitted inside 10 spoke 18" chrome shadow wheels. 0–100 km/h (0–60 m/h) takes just 6.1 seconds and can reach 400 meters (1/4 mile) under 14.7 seconds.

XU6 
Introduced in September 2000, the VX XU6 was powered by the 3.8-litre L67 supercharged v6 producing 180kw (241 hp) of power at 5000rpm and 380 nm (280 lb.ft) of torque at 3200rpm. These figures were unchanged from the previous model VT XU6 and like the VT XU6, the only transmission available was the 4L60-E 4 speed automatic unit. Standard features on the XU6 included but weren't limited to; 17-inch alloy wheels, six speaker sound with CD player, climate control air conditioning, cruise control, four-way powered driver seat, front fog lights, leather wrapped steering wheel, four airbags and an immobilizer. This was the last HSV vehicle that the XU6 nameplate was used on.

Exports 

Exports of the VX were made to the Middle East as the Chevrolet Lumina from 2000 as per the previous VT series. Trim levels were the Lumina LS sedan and wagon (based on Commodore Executive), Lumina LTZ sedan (Berlina), and Lumina SS sedan (Commodore SS).

General Motors do Brasil imported the VX as the Chevrolet Omega from 2001 to replace the VT-based Omega. This update was announced 18 May 2001. The Brazilian model sold as a single-specification CD model, based on the Holden Calais. VX Omega sales ended in 2003 when replaced by the VY-based model, as announced on 28 April 2003. The Omega, while based on the Calais specification, featured the boot lid from the more basic model VXs without the tail lamps extending into the boot lid.

Notes

References 

 
 
 

Cars of Australia
VX
Full-size vehicles
Rear-wheel-drive vehicles
Coupé utilities
Sedans
Station wagons
Police vehicles
Cars introduced in 2000